Irene Lilian Brodrick, Countess of Midleton (née Creese, known as Rene Ray, 22 September 1911 – 28 August 1993) was a British stage and screen actress of the 1930s, 1940s and 1950s and also a novelist.

Acting career
Ray made her screen début in the 1929 silent film High Treason and first appeared on the West End stage on 5 December 1930 in the André Charlot production of Wonder Bar at the Savoy Theatre. In 1935 she starred with Conrad Veidt in the Gaumont British film The Passing of the Third Floor Back. Other film co-stars included George Arliss (His Lordship, 1936), John Mills (The Green Cockatoo, 1937), Gordon Harker (The Return of the Frog, 1938) and Trevor Howard (They Made Me a Fugitive, 1947).

At London's Lyric Theatre in 1936 she appeared with Laurence Olivier and Ralph Richardson in JB Priestley's short-lived play Bees on the Boat Deck. Other West End credits included Yes and No (1937), They Walk Alone (1939) and Other People's Houses (1941). Her single Broadway appearance was in Cedric Hardwicke's production of Priestley's An Inspector Calls, which ran at the Booth Theatre from October 1947 to January 1948. In 1951–52 she starred in the London production of Sylvia Rayman's Women of Twilight, playing the central role nearly 450 times and reprising her performance in the subsequent film version.

She made her last screen appearance as an interviewee in the BBC documentary Britain's Missing Movie Heritage, broadcast on 30 September 1992, 11 months before her death.

Books
She turned to writing for much of her later career. Her first novel, Wraxton Marne, appeared in 1946. According to a 1953 magazine profile, "Her second book, Emma Conquest, was an immediate best-seller." (First published in 1950, this was reissued in 2010.) Other books included A Man Named Seraphin (1952) and The Tree Surgeon (1958). In 1956 she scripted the seven-part ATV science fiction serial The Strange World of Planet X; the following year her novelisation was published by Herbert Jenkins Ltd and a feature film based on it was made by Artistes Alliance. In the United States the film was renamed Cosmic Monsters.

Personal life
Her father was Alfred Edward Creese, a famous British automotive and aviation inventor. Born as Irene, she signed her name with a grave accent on the first 'e', not an acute accent on the second (Rène not René); her method was followed on all theatre programmes, book jackets and other publicity material.

Her first husband was the composer George Posford. In the 1950s she met George St John Brodrick, 2nd Earl of Midleton (1888–1979); she moved with him to Jersey in 1963 and became his third wife in 1975, thus allowing her to style herself the Countess of Midleton. In retirement she became an accomplished amateur painter and a member of the Jersey Film Society, which in 1986 opened its 40th season with a screening of The Passing of the Third Floor Back. She died on 28 August 1993 in Jersey, the Channel Islands.

Partial filmography

 High Treason (1929) - (uncredited)
 Varsity (1930) - Iris
 Young Woodley (1930) - Kitty
 Dance Pretty Lady (1931) - Elsie
 Tonight's the Night (1931) - Rose Smithers
 Keepers of Youth (1931) - Kitty Williams
 Two White Arms (1932) - Trixie
 When London Sleeps (1932) - Mary
 Here's George (1932) - Telephonist
 The King's Cup (1933) - Peggy
 Excess Baggage (1933) - Angela Murgatroyd
 Born Lucky (1933) - Mops
 Tiger Bay (1934) - Letty
 Rolling in Money (1934) - Eliza Dibbs
 Nine Forty-Five (1934) - Mary Doane
 Easy Money (1934) - Typist
 Once in a New Moon (1935) - Stella Drake
 Street Song (1935) - Lucy
 Regal Cavalcade (1935) - Girl
 Full Circle (1935) - Margery Boyd
 The Passing of the Third Floor Back (1935) - Stasia
 Beloved Imposter (1936) - Mary
 Secret Agent (1936) - Maid (uncredited)
 Crime Over London (1936) - Joan
 His Lordship (1936) - Vera
 Please Teacher (1937) - Ann Trent
 Farewell Again (1937) - Elsie Wainwright
 Jennifer Hale (1937) - Jennifer Hale
 The Rat (1937) - Odile Verdier
 The Green Cockatoo (1937) - Eileen
 Bank Holiday (1938) - Doreen
 Housemaster (1938) - Chris Faringdon
 Weddings Are Wonderful (1938) - Betty Leadbetter
 The Return of the Frog (1938) - Lela Oaks
 Mountains O'Mourne (1938) - Mary Macree
 Home from Home (1939) - Gladys Burton
 The Call for Arms (1940, Short) - Joan
 Old Bill and Son (1941) - Sally
 They Made Me a Fugitive (1947) - Cora
 If Winter Comes (1947) - Sarah 'Low Jinks'
 The Galloping Major (1951) - Pam Riley
 Women of Twilight (1952) - Vivianne
 The Good Die Young (1954) - Angela
The Vicious Circle (1957) - Mrs. Ambler

References

External links

1911 births
1993 deaths
British countesses
English film actresses
English stage actresses
Actresses from London
20th-century English actresses
20th-century English novelists
English women novelists
English female screenwriters
20th-century English screenwriters